See Aureliana Civitas for the Latin name of Orléans.Aureliana is a genus of plants in the family Solanaceae; it is exclusively found in South America, with its diversity being higher in the Brazilian Atlantic Rainforest. It contains the following species (but this list may be incomplete):
 Aureliana angustifolia Aureliana anonacea Aureliana brasiliana Aureliana cuspidata Aureliana darcyi Aureliana fasciculata (Vell.) Sendtn.
 Aureliana pogogena Aureliana sellowiana Aureliana tomentosa Aureliana velutina Aureliana wettsteiniana''

References

Physaleae
Solanaceae genera
Taxonomy articles created by Polbot